Smiling with No Teeth is the debut studio album by Australian musician Genesis Owusu, released on 5 March 2021 through Ourness. The album features a guest appearance from Kirin J. Callinan and production from Callinan, Andrew Klippel, Dave Hammer, Harvey Sutherland, Joe LaPorta, and Matt Corby.

Preceded by five singles—"Don't Need You", "Whip Cracker", "The Other Black Dog", "Gold Chains", and "Drown" (featuring Kirin J. Callinan)—Smiling with No Teeth debuted at number 27 on the ARIA Albums Chart.

At the 2021 ARIA Music Awards, the album won Album of the Year, Best Hip Hop Release and Best Independent Release while Andrew Klippel and Dave Hammer won the ARIA Award for Producer of the Year. Owusu was nominated for Best Artist and Kofi Anash & Bailey Howard were nominated for Best Cover Art.

At the J Awards of 2021, the album won the Australian Album of the Year and in March 2022, won the Australian Music Prize and Best Record at the 2022 Rolling Stone Australia Awards. at the AIR Awards of 2022, it won Independent Album of the Year.

Critical reception

Smiling with No Teeth received critical acclaim. At Metacritic, which assigns a normalized rating out of 100 to reviews from mainstream publications, the album received an average score of 86 based on six reviews, indicating "universal acclaim". The aggregator AnyDecentMusic? gave it 8.1 out of 10, based on their assessment of the critical consensus.

Mark Salisbury of Earmilk praised the album, saying that it "is a visceral sonic attack on the senses and should cement Genesis Owusu as an international renaissance man". Mike Vinti of Loud and Quiet said, "A triumph from top to bottom, Smiling with No Teeth sets the stage for Genesis Owusu to become a potentially generation-defining star". John Murphy of musicOMH said, "it's an album that's easy to feel intimidated by at first listen, due to its sheer scale and ambition. However, after a few listens you'll be in no doubt that Genesis Owusu is one of the most exciting names of the year". Steven Loftin of The Line of Best Fit said, "Owusu's debut offering not only manages to deftly balance style with substance, but does so with a jubilance that gives as much reason to curl up your own most toothy grin". Simone Ziaziaris of The Sydney Morning Herald said, "via forays into multiple musical genres, Smiling with No Teeth creates a space both for Owusu to express his own personal experiences, and for others to question nuanced complexities". Jenessa Williams of DIY said, "like Gorillaz, Outkast or even The Weeknd before him, he plays well with dark and sinister, throwing theatrical voice in a musical hall of mirrors with real versatility". Cyclone Wehner of NME said, "with Smiling With No Teeth, Genesis Owusu has delivered a riveting album that underscores the power of self-knowledge, perspective and art – one that should be cranked loud". Thomas H Green of The Arts Desk found that the album "brings to mind an overdose of references, but the musical magpie-ism is more Prince than pastiche". Rachel Brodsky of The Independent said, "with strong, clear-eyed subtext, overlaid by compositions that touch on every influence from TV on the Radio to Prince, Childish Gambino and Radiohead, Smiling With No Teeth is not so much an album as it is a memoir". Sofie Lindevall of Gigwise said that the album "has plenty of not only good, but great, songs and whether you are a fan of high energy hip-hop, raw punk-esque guitars or soulful R&B, there is something on the album for you".

Mid-year lists

Year-end lists

Commercial performance
Smiling with No Teeth debuted and peaked at number 27 on the ARIA Albums Chart for the chart dated 15 March 2021.

The album also debuted at number 3 on the ARIA Top 20 Vinyl Albums Chart, and at number 5 on the ARIA Top 20 Australian Albums Chart.

Track listing

Notes

 The deluxe version removes the outro of "The Other Black Dog", changing the length from 4:23 to 3:30

Personnel
Adapted from Jaxsta.

Musicians
 Genesis Owusu – writing, vocals 
Backing band
 Kirin J. Callinan – writing, vocals, guitar 
 Michael Di Francesco – writing, bass guitar 
 Julian Sudek  – writing, drums 
 Andrew Klippel – keyboard, writing 
Other musicians
 Dave Hammer – writing 
 David Haddad – writing 
 Harvey Sutherland – writing 
 Matt Corby – writing

Technical
 Andrew Klippel – production 
 Dave Hammer – production , engineering 
 Harvey Sutherland – production 
 Joe LaPorta – production , engineering 
 Matt Corby – production 
 Andrew Dawson – engineering 
 George Nicholas – engineering 
 James Dring – engineering 
 Konstantin Kersting – engineering 
 Simon Cohen – engineering

Charts

References

Notes

External links
 

2021 debut albums
ARIA Award-winning albums
Genesis Owusu albums
Albums produced by Matt Corby